Erin Michelle Wuthrich (born August 10, 1992), professionally as Ryn Weaver, is an American pop singer-songwriter who first garnered attention with the single "OctaHate" in June 2014. Billboard called the single a viral sensation. Her debut album, The Fool, followed in 2015.

Early life 
Ryn Weaver was born in Encinitas, California, to Maxwell "Max" Wuthrich, an architect, and Cynthia. She has Irish, Swiss, German, and Ukrainian ancestry. She has three brothers; Parker, Taylor, and Christopher. Weaver has stated that at a young age she chose to change the spelling of her name, Erin, to Aryn, claiming the original spelling was "ordinary and didn't suit [her]". The rest of her stage name, Weaver, is her mother's maiden name. She spent years learning different art forms including musical theater, painting, acting as well as music at Canyon Crest Academy in San Diego. Weaver moved to New York City for college to pursue her acting career where she attended New York University's Tisch School of the Arts before dropping out. She then moved back to California.

Career 
Weaver met producer Benny Blanco briefly in New York. A few years later they reconnected at Blanco's birthday party through a mutual friend in Los Angeles. Blanco signed Weaver to his imprint under Interscope Records, Friends Keep Secrets.

On June 21, 2014, Weaver posted her single "OctaHate" on her SoundCloud account and within hours it received attention from many artists including Charli XCX, Charlie Puth, Harry Styles, Jessie Ware and Hayley Williams of Paramore. The song also reached number one on Billboard Emerging Artists Chart on June 25, 2014.

On August 12, 2014, Weaver's debut EP, Promises was released as a digital download. Weaver's debut studio album, entitled The Fool, was released on June 16, 2015, through Mad Love and Interscope Records. It sold 13,800 units in its first week. Weaver performed at Lollapalooza on August 1, 2015. She performed at Billboard's first ever Hot 100 Festival on August 23, 2015.

On September 14, 2018, Neon Gold released Weaver's demo single titled "Reasons Not to Die". This was her first song in three years since The Fool.

Discography

Studio albums

Extended plays

Singles

Promotional singles

Other charted songs

Songwriting

Filmography

References 

1992 births
Living people
American women singer-songwriters
American women pop singers
American indie pop musicians
American people of German descent
American people of Spanish descent
American people of Swiss descent
American people of French-Canadian descent
Musicians from San Diego
21st-century American women singers
21st-century American singers
Singer-songwriters from California